Sunnykutty Abraham is an Indian journalist, writer and political analyst, based in Thiruvananthapuram, Kerala. He has worked with Mathrubhumi Daily for 25 years specializing in political journalism and 5 years as the Chief Editor and  COO of JaiHind TV, run by the  Kerala state unit of Indian National Congress.

Sunnykutty Abraham has anchored popular Malayalam current affairs related programs like "Neerkuneer", "Pathravishesham" in Asianet and "Oppam Nadannu" in  Indiavision for which he was the recipient of Lovers of Indian Visual Entertainment award for the best interview in 2004. He has also authored Sabhathalam: Nammude Niyama Nirmana Sabhakal, a book in Malayalam which details the procedures at various legislative assemblies in India.

References

Indian political journalists
Writers from Thiruvananthapuram
Living people
Journalists from Kerala
Indian male journalists
1955 births